Wilkowice may refer to:

Wilkowice, Greater Poland Voivodeship (west-central Poland)
Wilkowice, Kuyavian-Pomeranian Voivodeship (north-central Poland)
Wilkowice, Poddębice County in Łódź Voivodeship (central Poland)
Wilkowice, Rawa County in Łódź Voivodeship (central Poland)
Wilkowice, Lower Silesian Voivodeship (south-west Poland)
Wilkowice, Bielsko County in Silesian Voivodeship (south Poland)
Wilkowice, Świętokrzyskie Voivodeship (south-central Poland)
Wilkowice, Tarnowskie Góry County in Silesian Voivodeship (south Poland)
Wilkowice, West Pomeranian Voivodeship (north-west Poland)